Marc Parent  (born February 5, 1961) is a French-Canadian business executive, mechanical engineer, and philanthropist. He has been the president and chief executive officer of CAE since 2009.

Early life and education

Marc Parent was born in Verdun, Quebec. At the age of 12, he joined the 51st Air Cadet squadron in Ottawa. He later switched to the 783rd Air Cadet squadron in Montreal. Parent obtained his pilot's license through the Air Cadets at the age of 17. He remained in the Air Cadets for a total of 6 years.

Parent graduated from the Polytechnique Montréal in 1984 with a bachelor's degree in mechanical engineering. In 2012, Parent received an honorary doctorate from the same institution.

Parent is a graduate of the Harvard Business School's Advanced Management Program.

Career

Canadair and Bombardier

Parent began his engineering career as an aerospace engineer with Canadair in 1984. He started as an engineer on the Challenger and Canadair Regional Jet (CRJ) programs. Following the sale of Canadair to Bombardier by the Mulroney government in 1986, Parent continued his work on those programs. In 1987, he became manager of the Challenger's mechanical systems, with the mandate of fixing the aircraft's teething problems. In 1990, he was made responsible for setting up the Bombardier flight testing and certification center in Wichita, Kansas. In 1993, Parent's responsibilities were expanded, as he was promoted to project director for the Challenger 604. Soon after Bombardier's acquisition of de Havilland Canada, Parent was put in charge of the De Havilland Canada Dash 8-400 program. In 1998, he was named as Bombardier's vice president, Program Management, making him responsible for all of Bombardier's aircraft development programs, including the Global Express, the Learjet 45, the CRJ, and the upcoming Challenger 300.

From 2000 to 2004, Parent held various executive positions within Bombardier. In 2000, he was promoted to vice president, Operations, for Bombardier's De Havilland facility in Toronto, Canada. In 2001, he was named vice president and general manager of operations for that  facility. In 2003, he was promoted to vice president and general manager, U.S. operations. In 2004, Parent returned to Bombardier's Montreal facility in order to take on the role of vice president and general manager of the Challenger 300, Challenger 604, 850/870, and CRJ-200 aircraft programs.

CAE

In February 2005, Parent joined CAE to take on the role of group president, Simulation Products. CAE had been financially struggling since 2004, and Parent was hired to correct the situation. In 2006, he was promoted to group president, Simulation Products and Military Training & Services. His role at CAE was once again expanded in 2008, as he was promoted to executive vice president and chief operating officer. As executive vice president and COO, he was responsible for all four of the company's business segments and all new growth initiatives. In November 2008, he joined CAE's board of directors. Following the retirement of CAE's CEO Robert E. Brown August 12, 2009, CAE's board of directors announced that Parent would be chosen as his successor. Parent officially became president and chief executive officer of CAE in October 2009.

As president and CEO, Parent focused on expanding CAE's position in the flight training business and diversifying CAE's product portfolio, including expansion into the healthcare sector. Under his leadership, CAE expanded its core military training in the U.S. through the acquisition of L3 Harris' military training business.

Under Parent's leadership, CAE became the first carbon neutral Canadian aerospace company, and in January 2020, CAE was voted as one of Montreal's top employers.

COVID-19 response 
With the shortages of Personal Protective Equipment (PPE) for healthcare workers and ventilators in Canada at the onset of the COVID-19 pandemic, and the loss of revenue caused due to travel restrictions related to the pandemic, Parent shifted CAE's focus towards helping Canada's COVID-19 response. Under Parent's leadership, CAE developed the CAE Air1™ ventilator, signing a contract with the Government of Canada to manufacture and supply 10,000 ventilators. In 2021, Parent led the charge in a mobilization effort with many large Quebec and Canadian companies to work with the government so they could expedite the vaccination effort by opening their own "vaccination hubs" for employees.  CAE's vaccination centre opened in April 2021 and administered over 33,000 doses of vaccine.

Other corporate activities
Parent serves on the board of directors of Telus, McGill University Health Centre Foundation, and the Business Council of Canada (BCC).

Parent chaired the board for Aero Montreal, Quebec's aerospace cluster, from 2008 until 2010. He is a past board member and chair for the Aerospace Industries Association of Canada (AIAC). He also served as a member of the board of directors and executive committee for the Canadian Association of Defence and Security Industries (CADSI).

Philanthropy
Parent is a trustee of the Lakefield College School Foundation, and is a member of the Council of Governors for the greater Montreal branch of the United Way Centraide Canada Organization.

In 2013, he joined Michael E. Roach as co-president of the Centraide Cabinet de Campagne.

In 2019, Parent made a donation of $3 million to Lakefield College School for the construction of a new student residence. The new residence will be named the "Parent House" in his honor.

In 2019, he  joined Jean Raby as co-president of the Musée des beaux-arts de Montréal (MBAM) Ball.

In 2020, Parent made a $100,000 donation to the McGill University Health Centre (MUHC) Foundation. These funds were used to support research using the Biobanque québécoise de la COVID-19 (BQC19). In 2020, he joined Suzanne Legge Orr and Jean Charest as co-chairs of the MUHC Foundation's Dream Big campaign.

Awards and recognition

2005: Aerospace Engineering Leadership Award, Society of Automotive Engineers (SAE)
2005: Forest R. McFarland award
 2011: Defence Executive of the Year, Canadian Defence Review
 2012: Honorary Doctorate, Polytechnique Montréal
 2016: Merit Award, Association of Polytechnique Graduates
 2018: CEO of the year, Les Affaires
 2019: James C. Floyd award
 2020: Defence Executive of the Year, Canadian Defence Review
 2020: Bernard-Landry prize
 2020: Order of Canada  
2021: Prix Prospère, Conseil du patronat du Québec
2021: Canada's Aviation Hall of Fame
2022: Industry Leader of the Year award, Living Legends of Aviation
2022: Panthéon de l’Air et de l’Espace du Québec

References

Canadian businesspeople
1961 births
Living people
People from Verdun, Quebec
Harvard Business School alumni
Canadian mechanical engineers
Université de Montréal alumni
Members of the Order of Canada